Neofabraea malicorticis is a plant pathogen that causes bull's-eye rot on apple and pear.

References

Fungal tree pathogens and diseases
Apple tree diseases
Pear tree diseases
Dermateaceae